The Kinahan Organised Crime Group (KOCG), also known as the Kinahan Cartel, is a major Irish transnational organised crime syndicate alleged to be the most powerful in Ireland and one of the largest organised crime groups in the world. It is also established in the United Kingdom, Spain and the United Arab Emirates. It was founded by Christy Kinahan in the 1990s. His eldest son, Daniel manages the day-to-day operations of the family's criminal group. Estimated reports have credited them with wealth of up to €1 billion.

The Kinahan Cartel has had an ongoing feud with the Hutch Gang since 2015, which has resulted in 18 deaths as of August 2021.

Background
The Kinahan Organised Crime Group was founded by Christy Kinahan in the late 1990s and early 2000s while Ireland's "Celtic Tiger" period  of rapid economic growth was occurring. A native Dubliner, Kinahan's first convictions date back to the late 1970s and involved house breaking, car theft, burglary, handling stolen goods and forgery. The group reportedly began as a street gang of inner-city drug dealers in Dublin, but soon grew on a global scale to become the current multi-million dollar criminal network that it is today. Christy Kinahan served as the direct leader of the organisation up until the position was passed on to his son Daniel Kinahan. Since then, Irish courts have concluded that the group is a murderous organisation involved in the international trafficking of drugs and firearms.

On 12 April 2022, the United States Department of State announced the offering of rewards of up to 5 million under the Narcotics Rewards Program for information leading to the arrest and/or conviction of Kinahan family members. The reward is offered jointly with the Garda Síochána, National Crime Agency, and Drug Enforcement Administration. The seven key members were named as: Daniel Kinahan; Christopher Kinahan; Christopher Kinahan Jnr; veteran Dublin-born criminal Bernard Clancy; Daniel Kinahan’s “advisor and closest confidant" Sean McGovern; former KOCG enforcer now Marbella-based money launderer "Johnny Cash" Morrissey; and Ian Dixon who was arrested over the 2015 Costa del Sol murder of Gary Hutch but never charged.

Despite the sanctions being imposed on the group, it was reported in August 2022 that Spanish-based associates of the Kinahan cartel were continuing to operate multi-million-euro drug shipments. "Johnny Cash" Morrissey and his wife Nicola were arrested in Marbella, Spain on Monday 13 September 2022.

In February 2023, a raid on a business in the Long Mile Road area of Dublin led to the seizure of equipment, the arrest of eight people and 40 kg of cocaine. Over 2,000 containers of nitric oxide were seized, as well as €78,000 in case, a hydraulic drugs press, communications devices, mixing agent and a money counter. Two of those arrested were later released.

Kinahan family and associates

The Kinahan crime family is primarily involved in the drug trade.

Christy Kinahan – Also known as "the Dapper Don", Christy is the founder of the Kinahan crime group. He has served prison sentences in Ireland, The Netherlands and Belgium, including six years for dealing heroin, two-and-a-half years for possession of cocaine, and four years for money laundering.
Daniel Kinahan – Christy's eldest son, and allegedly manages the day-to-day operations of the family's criminal empire. A boxing promoter, Daniel has worked as an advisor for Tyson Fury.
Ross Browning - A native of Dublin, Ireland, he is one of the Kinahan family's top lieutenants. Considered Daniel Kinahan's right-hand man, he has been responsible for the operations of the Kinahan crime syndicate in Ireland for over two decades and as a result, he has become a priority target for the Gardaí and the CAB due to his proximity to Daniel Kinahan.
Paul Rice – A high-ranking member of the Kinahan family, he is known for being extremely violent and because of this, he is considered a high-value target by other enemy gangs.
Thomas "Bomber" Kavanagh – One of the leaders of the Kinahan family (he is the second-in-command), he is considered by many to be Ireland's most feared mobster and is considered the main name of the Kinahan family in the United Kingdom. He is known to be brutal and violent, being responsible for at least seven murders. He is also known for being the head of the UK branch of the Kinahan gang.
Freddie Thompson – A cousin of Liam Byrne, he was the head of the Dublin branch of the Kinahan gang from 1997 to 2008, when he had to leave Ireland over a feud he had with the Irish National Liberation Army (INLA). He is currently serving a life sentence for the murder of David Douglas.
Liam Byrne – A notorious and dangerous Dublin gangster, he is a high-ranking member of the Kinahan Family. He comes from a criminal family led by his father James Byrne (who was an associate of notorious Irish gangster Martin "The General" Cahill) and is the older brother of David Byrne, an associate of the Kinahan Family who was murdered on 5 February 2016 at the Regency Hotel in Whitehall, Dublin.
Gerard "Hatchet" Kavanagh – He was believed to have worked as a debt collector and enforcer for the Kinahans. He was shot dead on 5 September 2014 in Elivira, Marbella. Aged 44 at the time of his death, he had been heavily involved in the drug trade for over 20 years.
Imre "The Butcher" Arakas – A notorious Estonian hitman, he is known for committing murders in several European countries, such as Estonia, Lithuania, Spain and Ireland, in addition to having killed dozens of members of the Russian Mafia.
Declan "Mr Nobody" Brady – One of Daniel Kinahan's closest associates, he holds some of the most important positions within the gang: he is the main logistics man and quartermaster of the Kinahans, being primarily responsible for the gang's weapons depot and for their safety as a result.
Ciaran O'Driscoll – A footsoldier for the gang, he has a criminal record that ranges from possession of illegal drugs to attempted murder.
Leon Griffin – A footsoldier for the gang, he is a friend of Freddie Thompson and is known to be one of the most brutal and volatile criminals not only in the Kinahan family, but in all of Dublin.
Jamie Griffin – A footsoldier for the gang, he is the younger brother of Leon Griffin.
Sean Gerard McGovern – Daniel Kinahan's advisor and closest confidant. He has managed communications on behalf of Daniel Kinahan and sells multi-kilogram quantities of cocaine.
Ian Thomas Dixon – He has arranged multiple payments on behalf of Daniel Kinahan, as well as moved bulk currency in Ireland and the United Kingdom.
Bernard Patrick Clancy – A childhood friend of Daniel Kinahan. He was previously jailed for drugs offences on the Costa del Sol.
John Francis "Johnny Cash" Morrissey – Manchester, England-born former Cork restaurateur, Morrissey worked as an enforcer before fleeing Ireland in the early 2000s after reportedly being involved in a bid to harm an Irish Criminal Assets Bureau officer. Based in Marbella, Spain ever since, Morrissey allegedly became the KOCG drugs shipping organiser and money launderer. On the morning of Monday 13 September 2022, a combined force of six enforcement agencies led by the Spanish Civil Guard's elite Central Operative Unit, arrested Morrissey at his villa in Marbella - the first of the seven men named by the United States' Office of Foreign Assets Control (OFAC) in April 2022 to be arrested. Morrissey had gained notoriety from being part of the team publicising his wife Nicola's Scottish-based Nero Drinks Company Ltd, which was thought to be part of Morrissey's €200 million annual money-laundering operation, leading to her arrest as well at the same time.

References

Kinahan Organised Crime Group
Organizations established in the 1990s
1990s establishments in Ireland
Drug cartels
Organised crime groups in Ireland
Organised crime groups in Spain
Organised crime groups in the United Kingdom